The Women's Overall competition in the 2016 FIS Alpine Skiing World Cup involved 40 events in 5 disciplines: downhill (DH), Super-G (SG), giant slalom (GS), slalom (SL) (which included one city event), and Alpine combined (AC) (which included one super-combined).  A city event is a slalom conducted on a two-lane artificial ramp erected in a major city (for example, Stockholm this season, as well as Moscow, Munich, and Oslo); a super-combined (run at Val d'Isère in December 2015) consists of a downhill followed by a one-run slalom, as opposed to an Alpine combined (the other combined race currently contested), which consists of a Super-G followed by a one-run slalom.

At the start of the season, the three still-active prior overall women's champions -- two-time defending champion Anna Fenninger of Austria (2014–15), Tina Maze of Slovenia (2013), and Lindsey Vonn of the USA (2008–10, 2012) -- were all inactive. Fenninger had to miss the entire season due to a serious knee injury in October.  Maze, an all-discipline skier who had been runner-up behind Fenninger in 2015, took a full-year hiatus before deciding whether to continue or permanently retire. And Vonn was still recovering from, first, her season-ending injury in early 2015, and then a dog bite, and she didn't return until December 2015. Then, in early December, just a handful of events into the season, Mikaela Shiffrin of the USA, overall fourth last season and slalom discipline champion for the last three seasons, suffered an injury during practice at Åre, which caused her to miss the two months at the heart of the season; she did not return until mid-February (and promptly dominated the competition, although it was too late to contend for the season crown).

With all of the injuries, Vonn, who herself missed more time due to injuries in late December, nevertheless had opened a narrow lead in the overall standings.  When the World Cup went to Andorra in late February, Vonn had already won the Downhill discipline for the season and was leading in the Overall, Super-G and Combined disciplines for the season. However, on February 27, during the Super-G in Soldeu, Vonn crashed again near the end of her run while leading. She still raced the next day in the Combined event, although failing to podium, but on Monday a complete medical evaluation in Barcelona revealed multiple significant (not hairline, as she had thought) fractures in her knee from the Super-G crash, which ended her season at once.

After Vonn's injury, 24-year-old Lara Gut of Switzerland, Vonn's closest pursuer, grabbed the overall lead and ended up as the season champion by almost 300 points.

Appropriately, the World Cup season finals were held in St. Moritz, Switzerland for the first time since the World Cup season finals began in 1993, although five of the previous eleven finals were held in Switzerland (all at Lenzerheide).

Standings

See also
 2016 Alpine Skiing World Cup – Women's summary rankings
 2016 Alpine Skiing World Cup – Women's Downhill
 2016 Alpine Skiing World Cup – Women's Super-G
 2016 Alpine Skiing World Cup – Women's Giant Slalom
 2016 Alpine Skiing World Cup – Women's Slalom
 2016 Alpine Skiing World Cup – Women's Combined
 2016 Alpine Skiing World Cup – Men's Overall

References

External links
 Alpine Skiing at FIS website

Women's Overall
FIS Alpine Ski World Cup overall titles